On 4 October 2019, Ukraine Air Alliance Flight 4050 crashed due to fuel exhaustion on approach to Lviv International Airport, during a flight from Vigo, Spain to Istanbul, Turkey via Lviv, Ukraine, killing five people, and three people were seriously injured. The aircraft was an Antonov An-12. The crash is currently under investigation.

Aircraft 
The accident aircraft was an Antonov An-12 cargo aircraft, powered by four turboprop engines, registered as UR-CAH and built in 1968 with manufacturer serial number 8345064.

Accident 
The aircraft departed Vigo-Peinador Airport in Spain, bound for Istanbul Airport in Turkey, with eight people aboard, seven crew and one passenger, which was a cargo escort. Flight 4050 was a cargo flight, carrying  of cargo, with the intention to stop-over on Lviv International Airport, in Ukraine for refueling, before continuing to Istanbul. 

The crew declared an emergency and started to perform an emergency landing, but failed to reach the runway. The aircraft impacted the ground at 7:10 a.m. just  before the Runway 31 threshold, close to the village of Sokilnyky. The cockpit section broke off on impact, then the cargo shifted, crushing and killing 5 occupants.

Emergency response 
At 7:29 a.m. the crew member called and reported the aircraft performed an emergency landing. By 9:00 a.m. it was determined there were eight people aboard. Three of them were found seriously injured and they were taken to the hospital. Three bodies were also found, while two were still missing. Later two missing bodies were found, all dead. It was finally determined five people perished in the crash, at least four of them were crew, and the sole passenger, a cargo escort.

Response
Data from:'

Ukraine's ministry of infrastructure 
Initially it was reported that there were three crew and one passenger, all four killed, but it was eventually corrected by the ministry. The ministry also confirmed that the aircraft was carrying ten tons of cargo.

Lviv's mayor 
Lviv's mayor noted that the aircraft performed the emergency landing due to fuel exhaustion.

Investigation 
Ukraine's NBAAI opened officially investigation of the accident on 9 October, four days after the crash. The on site work of the commission took place between October 5 and 7. The other information, such as air traffic control communication, radar data, weather information, emergency service response and ground based navigation aids at the airport were also collected. The investigation is currently in progress.

Aftermath 
The day after the crash Ukraine Air Alliance was banned from operating flights in European Union airspace. On 7 October 2019, State Aviation Administration of Ukraine announced that air operator's certificate of Ukraine Air Alliance was terminated effective 5 October 2019, 00:00 UTC after an accident.

See also 
Tuninter Flight 1153, ditching due to fuel exhaustion 
List of accidents and incidents involving commercial aircraft

References 

2019 in Ukraine
Aviation accidents and incidents in Ukraine
Aviation accidents and incidents in 2019
October 2019 events in Ukraine
Accidents and incidents involving the Antonov An-12
History of Lviv
2019 disasters in Ukraine